Ross Creek Aerodrome  is located just east of Ross Creek, next to Shuswap Lake, British Columbia, Canada.

References

Registered aerodromes in British Columbia